M89SR sniper rifle is a gas operated semi-automatic precision rifle, produced by Technical Consultants International (TCI), an Israeli company based in Tel Aviv.

The M89SR was first introduced as the Sardius M36 Sniper Weapon System (SWS) in the 1980s. The rifle is based on the American M14 rifle in bullpup configuration, and uses the same 7.62×51mm NATO ammunition. It was intended to replace the M14, though Sardius were unable to secure financing. When Sardius went out of business, Technical Consulting International (TCI) obtained the licence to produce the M36. They made some adjustments, such as adding a new carbon fiber stock, and it was renamed the M89SR (Model 89 Sniper Rifle).

The rifle was used by the Israel Defense Forces, in urban warfare and on the battlefield. The rifle is much shorter than an assault rifle even with a sound suppressor attached, making it easy to conceal. It is also relatively light, and is more accurate than other sniper rifles.

Only a small number were used, in the undercover unit Sayeret Duvdevan. It was more successful abroad, and was sold to some special forces units.

See also
List of bullpup firearms
List of sniper rifles
Science and technology in Israel

References

7.62×51mm NATO semi-automatic rifles
Sniper rifles of Israel
Bullpup rifles